The Commonwealth Broadcasting Association (CBA) is a representative body for public service broadcasters throughout the Commonwealth, founded in 1945. A not-for-profit non-government organisation, the CBA is funded by subscriptions from 102 members and affiliates from 54 countries. The stated goal of the CBA is to promote best practices in public service broadcasting and to foster freedom of expression. It also serves to provide support and assistance to its members through training, bursaries, consultancies, networking opportunities and materials for broadcast.

The CBA holds a biennial general conference, with the last one held in Glasgow, Scotland, United Kingdom in 2014. It also aims to provide consultancy to member organisations in areas of management and finance and help local organisers who need specialised help in running broadcast-related workshops. In addition it offers a number of bursaries to full-time employees of its member organisations to enhance their skills and knowledge.

In 2014, the organization unanimously voted to rename itself into the Public Media Alliance.

History 

The CBA traces its roots to a broadcasting conference on 15 February 1945 between Australia, Canada, India, New Zealand, South Africa and the United Kingdom. This brought together representatives of the broadcasting organisations that had co-operated closely in reporting the Second World War and was held in the council chamber of Broadcasting House in London.

The title "Commonwealth Broadcasting Association" was adopted in Malta in 1974 as well as the CBA charter. It stipulates that membership "shall be open to publicly owned national public service broadcasting organisations, or groups of such organisations, which are responsible for the planning, production and presentation of broadcast programmes in Commonwealth countries". This was modified in 1995 to allow for membership of commercial companies with a commitment to public service broadcasting and to allow for affiliate membership.

Membership

CBA Full Members 

 Australian Broadcasting Corporation
 Special Broadcasting Service

 Broadcasting Corporation of the Bahamas (ZNS-TV/ZNS-1)

 Bangladesh Betar (Radio)
 Bangladesh Television

 Caribbean Broadcasting Corporation
 Starcom Network

 Botswana Department of Broadcasting Services

 Radio Television Brunei

 Cameroon Radio Television

 Canadian Broadcasting Corporation
 TV Ontario

 Radio Cayman 1

 Cyprus Broadcasting Corporation

 Eswatini Broadcasting and Information Service
 Eswatini Television Authority

 Ghana Broadcasting Corporation

 Gibraltar Broadcasting Corporation

 Grenada Broadcasting Network

National Communications Network

 All India Radio
 Doordarshan
 Lok Sabha Television
 New Delhi Television

 CVM Communications Group
 RJR Communications Group

 Kenya Broadcasting Corporation
 Nation Broadcasting Division

 Lesotho National Broadcasting Service

 Malawi Broadcasting Corporation

 Radio Television Malaysia

 MNBC (MNBC One/Voice of Maldives)

 RTM (RTM)

 Mauritius Broadcasting Corporation

 Radio Montserrat

 Independent Television of Mozambique
 Rádio Moçambique
 Soico Television
 Televisão de Moçambique

 Namibian Broadcasting Corporation

 Māori Television
 Radio New Zealand
 Television New Zealand

 Channels TV
 Daar Communications
 Federal Radio Corporation of Nigeria
 Gateway Radio, Ogun State Broadcasting
 Nigerian Television Authority
 Voice of Nigeria

 Eye Television Network Limited (renamed as Hum Network)
 Geo TV
 Pakistan Broadcasting Corporation
 Pakistan Television Corporation

 EM TV

 Rwanda Bureau of Information and Broadcasting

 Ziz Broadcasting Corporation

 National Broadcasting Corporation

 Samoa Quality Broadcasting Corporation

 Seychelles Broadcasting Corporation

 Mediacorp

 Sierra Leone Broadcasting Services

 One News Limited

 e.tv
 South African Broadcasting Corporation

 The Capital Maharaja Organisation Limited(MBC Networks and MTV Channel)

 ITV Independent Television Tanzania
 Tanzania Broadcasting Corporation

 Tonga Broadcasting Commission

 Caribbean New Media Group
 CCN TV6

 Uganda Broadcasting Corporation

 British Broadcasting Corporation
 Islam Channel
 Manx Radio

Zambia National Broadcasting Corporation

See also
European Broadcasting Union
Asia-Pacific Broadcasting Union
World Radio Network
North American Broadcasters Association
Caribbean Broadcasting Union
Commonwealth Press Union

References

External links
Commonwealth Broadcasting Association
Public Broadcasters International
Asia-Pacific Institute for Broadcasting Development

Publicly funded broadcasters
Commonwealth Family
Broadcasting associations
Organizations established in 1945
Non-profit organisations based in London